John Enos III (born June 12, 1962) is an American film and television actor.

He has guest starred on television programs Murder, She Wrote, Sex and the City, NYPD Blue, and CSI: NY, among other TV series.

Enos's film credits include Death Becomes Her (1992), Demolition Man (1993), The Rock (1996), Blade (1998), Flawless (1999), Phone Booth (2002), Everybody Wants to Be Italian (2007) and Toxic (2008).

In 2018, Enos was nominated for the Daytime Emmy Award for Outstanding Guest Performer, for his role as Roger, an Elvis impersonator and partner to Eileen Davidson's Susan Banks, on the soap opera Days of Our Lives.

Personal life
John Enos was born on June 12, 1962, in Boston, Massachusetts, of Italian and Portuguese ancestry. He was married to Jennie Lee from 2006 until her death on February 18, 2012.

Enos attended Bentley and Salem State College. Prior to becoming an actor, he was a bartender in New York City.

Career

Enos entered show business in his late 20s in 1991 when he landed a spot on In Living Color, a comedy sketch show created by Keenen Ivory Wayans. This was followed by a part as a bodyguard in Death Becomes Her, a comedy directed by Robert Zemeckis released on July 31, 1992.

Enos was next featured as a prisoner in Demolition Man (1993). He appeared in the films Unveiled (1994), Ripple (1995), and Till the End of the Night (1995). Enos appeared as Randy Konig in an episode of Murder, She Wrote called "Murder at a Discount" (1993) and had a two-episode role in Showtime's Red Shoe Diaries (1993-1994). He got his first significant TV role in the hit primetime soap opera Melrose Place (Fox, 1992–99), playing Bobby Parezi in 19 episodes from 1995 to 1996.

In 1996, Enos starred in the horror film Dead of Night, and supported Mickey Rourke in Bullet. The same year, he costarred as Marshall Del Wilkes in the television film Raven Hawk (HBO) and portrayed Matt Conrad in Showtime's Miami Hustle.

He landed the role of Bobby Marsino in the daytime soap opera The Young and the Restless (CBS). While working on the show, he appeared in Lance Lane's film The Kings of Brooklyn (2004). After leaving The Young and the Restless, he costarred in the TV series pilot Special Unit (Comedy Central, 2006). He appeared in an episode of CSI: NY (2006) and in In Case of Emergency (2007). He had a small role in The Hammer (2007). He was next cast in Missionary Man (2007), an action thriller directed, co-written by and starring Dolph Lundgren. 

On television, Enos acted in the made for TV films Shark Swarm and Finish Line. His voice could be heard as a newscaster on two episodes of Days of Our Lives and he later played a minor role on the show portraying Elvis Presley.  Since 2008, he serves as a commentator on the cable television series The Smoking Gun Presents: World's Dumbest..., which debuted on truTV on March 13, 2008.

References

External links
 

1962 births
American male film actors
American male soap opera actors
American male television actors
Living people
Male actors from Boston
American people of Italian descent
American people of Greek descent
American people of Portuguese descent